Milan Menten (born 31 October 1996 in Bilzen) is a Belgian cyclist, who currently rides for UCI ProTeam .

Major results

2014
 1st Stage 3 Trofeo Karlsberg
2016
 4th Grote Prijs Stad Sint-Niklaas
2017
 2nd Paris–Tours Espoirs
 5th Overall Okolo Jižních Čech
1st Stage 1 (TTT)
2018
 5th Paris–Bourges
 5th Famenne Ardenne Classic
 9th Elfstedenronde
2019
 7th Grand Prix Pino Cerami
 8th Grand Prix d'Ouverture La Marseillaise
2020
 10th Gooikse Pijl
2021
 1st Stage 3 CRO Race
 1st  Points classification, Kreiz Breizh Elites
 5th Road race, National Road Championships
 6th Ronde van Limburg
 7th Binche–Chimay–Binche
 9th La Roue Tourangelle
 9th Paris–Bourges
 10th Le Samyn
 10th Overall Tour de Wallonie
2022
 1st Grand Prix de la Ville de Lillers
 4th Ronde van Limburg
 4th Schaal Sels
 5th Road race, National Road Championships
 7th Circuit de Wallonie 
 8th Circuit Franco–Belge
 9th Druivenkoers Overijse
 9th Antwerp Port Epic 
2023
 1st Le Samyn
 3rd Nokere Koerse
 7th Grand Prix de Denain
 9th Vuelta a Murcia

References

External links

1996 births
Living people
Belgian male cyclists
People from Bilzen
Cyclists from Limburg (Belgium)
21st-century Belgian people